Passu Sar (or Passu Sar, Passu I) is a mountain peak in the Batura Muztagh, a sub-range of the Karakoram mountain range, in the Hunza District of Gilgit-Baltistan, Pakistan. It is the high point of the Passu massif, which also includes Passu Diar (or "Passu East", "Pasu II"). The peak lies on the main ridge of the Batura Muztagh, about 7 km (4 mi) east of Batura Sar.

The date of the first successful ascent of Passu Sar is disputed. It has been reported as first climbed on 7 August 1994 by the German team of Max Wallner, Dirk Naumann, Ralf Lehmann, and Volker Wurnig. Another report claims it was climbed in 1978 by a Japanese-Pakistani team.

See also
 Gojal
 Passu
 Hunza
 List of mountains in Pakistan
 Highest Mountains of the World

References

External links
 Northern Pakistan detailed placemarks in Google Earth

Seven-thousanders of the Karakoram
Mountains of Gilgit-Baltistan